Never Quite The Same is a 2008 film starring Jo Cox, Simon Berry and Robin Lee Nettleton. It was directed by Paul Vernon and Clive Bowden.

Plot 
Simon Kelly who on visiting the Isle of Wight,  meets Rachel Burton,  someone he briefly knew many years before.  When he approaches her,  she claims not to remember him. He asks her if she is Rachel Burton,  and she confirms she is. Later,  when he tells Phil Harrison,  he also remembers the name.  When Phil,  who owns a local newspaper, looks up Rachel on various databases, he finds that she actually died in 1986.

The film starts just before a party in the summer of 1984,  in a country lane,  where a drug dealer is preparing to set off for a village hall party.
At the party,  Simon Kelly meets Rachel Burton,  who has only gone to the party to buy drugs,  and ends up back at her house.  During the course of their conversations,  Rachel tells him she will be dead by the time she's 25,  adding that she believes life is pointless.  After spending the night with her,  Simon meets one of his friends from the party,  who laughs when he finds out where Simon has been.  Simon then throws Rachel's telephone number into the sea.

The film then cuts to the present day.  Phil Harrison arrives to visit Simon,  and finds him hungover and surrounded by empty wine bottles and lager cans.  Simon tells him about his visit to the Isle of Wight,  and his meeting with Rachel Burton. When Phil realizes Rachel Burton died in 1986,  this raises the question,  how did Simon have a conversation with someone who's dead ?  Phil doesn't believe in anything that isn't tangible,  but one of his employees at the newspaper runs a sideline publication called Actual Reality,  which features interviews with people who claim to have accidentally found doors through time. Phil tells Simon of a charity dinner he’d been to with his employee,  Chris Hampton,  and the argument he’d witnessed between Chris and a vicar who had strongly discouraged Chris from taking any further interest in the suggestion of the existence of time doors. The argument had almost developed into a fight,  as the vicar told him not to interfere with things he knew nothing about,  and that if he did,  no good would come of it.  The film raises as many questions as it answers as Phil gets Simon to describe his daytrip in detail.  Through this they work out that Simon must have accidentally gone back in time before he met Rachel,  and he must also have come back to the present day before he came home.  Simon has told Phil he climbed over the wall from a church yard into a park,  as a shortcut,  and that he took the same route later when he came back.  Phil is convinced this must be where the time door is,  on the basis that it is the only place he passed once in each direction.

Phil does some more research and finds out Rachel Burton had committed suicide in 1986 due to depression,  after the death of her mother in a car accident.  Simon admits he feels partly to blame because he feels that he used Rachel,  and never went back to see her again. Phil comments that they are both probably to blame and confesses that it was he who sold her the drugs at the party where Simon met her.
They know from Phil’s research, the date of the accident in which Rachel’s mother died,  and go back to 1984 on  the night before it is due to happen. They set fire to her mother’s car so she cannot drive it and have the accident.

The film concludes when a week later,  Phil takes Simon to the railway station and Rachel Burton walks by.  Phil,  who has an up-to-date photograph of her,  ushers Simon in her direction,  they have a conversation and this time she remembers him.
As they are sitting in Phil’s car afterwards,  watching the Isle of Wight ferry leave Portsmouth,  Simon says he’s barely able to believe the events of the last week.  Phil then reveals that the reason Rachel recognized Simon is that the day after the car fire,  he had returned to the island on his own,  and visited Rachel Burton’s home,  to check if her mother was still alive.  As an optional extra he had told Rachel to meet him in a café in Ryde on the following Saturday.  Obviously he had failed to show up as he’d gone back to his own time by then.  But he knew Simon had gone over there on that date as it was his birthday, and he’d told Phil which café he had been in.

External links
 www.britfilms.com
 
 IMDB Entry

2008 films